Electoral history of Ted Kennedy, United States Senator from Massachusetts (1962–2009) and, at the time of his death, the second most senior member of the Senate.

United States Senate races

Massachusetts Democratic primary for the United States Senate, 1962:
 Ted Kennedy – 559,303 (69.33%)
 Edward J. McCormack, Jr. – 247,403 (30.67%)

Massachusetts United States Senate special election, 1962:
 Ted Kennedy (D) – 1,162,611 (55.44%)
 George Cabot Lodge (R) – 877,668 (41.85%)
 H. Stuart Hughes (I) – 50,013 (2.38%)
 Lawrence Gilfedder (Socialist Labor) – 5,330 (0.25%)
 Mark R. Shaw (Prohibition) – 1,439 (0.07%)

United States Senate election in Massachusetts, 1964:
 Ted Kennedy (D) (inc.) – 1,716,907 (74.26%)
 Howard J. Whitmore, Jr. (R) – 587,663 (25.42%)
 Lawrence Gilfedder (Socialist Labor) – 4,745 (0.21%)
 Grace F. Luder (Prohibition) – 2,700 (0.12%)

United States Senate election in Massachusetts, 1970:
 Ted Kennedy (D) (inc.) – 1,202,856 (62.16%)
 Josiah Spaulding (R) – 715,978 (37.00%)
 Lawrence Gilfedder (Socialist Labor) – 10,378 (0.54%)
 Mark R. Shaw (Prohibition) – 5,944 (0.31%)

Massachusetts Democratic primary for the United States Senate, 1976:
 Ted Kennedy (inc.) – 534,725 (73.86%)
 Robert E. Dinsmore – 117,496 (16.23%)
 Frederick C. Langone – 59,315 (8.19%)
 Bernard Shannon – 12,399 (1.71%)
 Others – 53 (0.01%)

United States Senate election in Massachusetts, 1976:
 Ted Kennedy (D) (inc.) – 1,726,657 (69.31%)
 Michael S. Robertson (R) – 722,641 (29.01%)
 Carol Henderson Evans (Socialist Workers) – 26,283 (1.06%)
 H. Graham Lowry (US Labor) – 15,517 (0.62%)
 
United States Senate election in Massachusetts, 1982:
 Ted Kennedy (D) (inc.) – 1,247,084 (60.82%)
 Ray Shamie (R) – 784,602 (38.26%)
 Howard S. Katz (Libertarian) – 18,878 (0.92%)

United States Senate election in Massachusetts, 1988:
 Ted Kennedy (D) (inc.) – 1,693,344 (64.97%)
 Joseph D. Malone (R) – 884,267 (33.93%)
 Mary Fridley (New Alliance) – 15,208 (0.58%)
 Frede Lee Nanson (Libertarian) – 13,199 (0.51%)
 Others – 207 (0.01%)

Massachusetts Democratic primary for the United States Senate, 1994:
 Ted Kennedy (inc.) – 391,637 (98.87%)
 Others – 4,498 (1.14%)

United States Senate election in Massachusetts, 1994:
 Ted Kennedy (D) (inc.) – 1,265,997 (58.08%)
 Mitt Romney (R) – 894,000 (41.01%)
 Lauraleigh Dozier (Libertarian) – 14,484 (0.66%)
 William A. Ferguson, Jr. (LaRouche Movement) – 4,776 (0.22%)
 Others – 688 (0.03%)

Massachusetts Democratic primary for the United States Senate, 2000:
 Ted Kennedy (inc.) – 236,883 (98.97%)
 Others – 2,467 (1.03%)

United States Senate election in Massachusetts, 2000:
 Ted Kennedy (D) (inc.) – 1,887,479 (72.61%)
 Jack E. Robinson III (R) – 334,700 (12.88%)
 Carla Howell (Libertarian) – 308,748 (11.88%)
 Philip F. Lawler (Constitution) – 42,316 (1.63%)
 Dale E. Friedgen (I) – 15,453 (0.59%)
 R. Philip Hyde (I) – 8,444 (0.33%)
 Others – 2,474 (0.10%)

United States Senate election in Massachusetts, 2006:
 Ted Kennedy (D) (inc.) – 1,500,738 (69.30%)
 Kenneth Chase (R) – 661,532 (30.55%)
 Others – 3,220 (0.15%)

Presidential and vice presidential races

1964 Massachusetts Democratic presidential primary:

All votes were cast as write-ins

 Lyndon B. Johnson (inc.) – 61,035 (72.91%)
 Robert F. Kennedy – 15,870 (18.96%)
 Henry Cabot Lodge, Jr. – 2,269 (2.71%)
 Ted Kennedy – 1,259 (1.50%)
 Adlai Stevenson II – 952 (1.14%)
 George Wallace – 565 (0.68%)
 Hubert Humphrey – 323 (0.39%)

1968 Democratic Presidential primaries:
 Eugene McCarthy – 2,914,933 (38.73%)
 Robert F. Kennedy – 2,305,148 (30.63%)
 Stephen M. Young – 549,140 (7.30%)
 Lyndon B. Johnson (inc.) – 383,590 (5.10%)
 Thomas C. Lynch – 380,286 (5.05%)
 Roger D. Branigin – 238,700 (3.17%)
 George Smathers – 236,242 (3.14%)
 Hubert Humphrey – 166,463 (2.21%)
 Unpledged delegates – 161,143 (2.14%)
 Scott Kelly – 128,899 (1.71%)
 George Wallace – 34,489 (0.46%)
 Richard Nixon – 13,610 (0.18%)
 Ronald Reagan – 5,309 (0.07%)
 Ted Kennedy – 4,052 (0.05%)
 Paul C. Fisher – 506 (0.01%)
 John G. Crommelin – 186 (0.00%)

1968 Democratic National Convention (Presidential tally):
 Hubert Humphrey – 1,760 (67.43%)
 Eugene McCarthy – 601 (23.03%)
 George McGovern – 147 (5.63%)
 Channing E. Phillips – 68 (2.61%)
 Daniel K. Moore – 18 (0.69%)
 Ted Kennedy – 13 (0.50%)
 Paul Bryant – 1 (0.04%)
 James H. Gray – 1 (0.04%)
 George Wallace – 1 (0.04%)

1968 Democratic National Convention (Vice Presidential tally):
 Edmund Muskie – 1,945 (74.01%)
 Abstaining – 605 (23.02%)
 Julian Bond – 49 (1.87%)
 David C. Hoeh – 4 (0.15%)
 Ted Kennedy – 4 (0.15%)
 Eugene McCarthy – 3 (0.11%)
 Richard J. Daley – 2 (0.08%)
 Don Edwards – 2 (0.08%)
 George McGovern – 2 (0.08%)
 Robert McNair – 2 (0.08%)
 Abraham A. Ribicoff – 2 (0.08%)
 James Tate – 2 (0.08%)
 Allard Lowenstein – 1 (0.04%)
 Paul O'Dwyer – 1 (0.04%)
 Henry Reuss – 1 (0.04%)
 William F. Ryan – 1 (0.04%)
 Terry Sanford – 1 (0.04%)
 Sargent Shriver – 1 (0.04%)

Liberal Party presidential convention, 1968:
 Hubert Humphrey – 199 (89.64%)
 Abstaining – 11 (4.96%)
 None of these candidates – 11 (4.96%)
 Ted Kennedy – 1 (0.45%)

1972 Democratic presidential primaries:
 Hubert Humphrey – 4,121,372 (25.77%)
 George McGovern – 4,053,451 (25.34%)
 George Wallace – 3,755,424 (23.48%)
 Edmund Muskie – 1,840,217 (11.51%)
 Eugene McCarthy – 553,990 (3.46%)
 Henry M. Jackson – 505,198 (3.16%)
 Shirley Chisholm – 430,703 (2.69%)
 Terry Sanford – 331,415 (2.07%)
 John Lindsay – 196,406 (1.23%)
 Samuel Yorty – 79,446 (0.50%)
 Wilbur Mills – 37,401 (0.23%)
 Walter E. Fauntroy – 21,217 (0.13%)
 Unpledged – 19,533 (0.12%)
 Ted Kennedy – 16,693 (0.10%)
 Vance Hartke – 11,798 (0.07%)
 Patsy Mink – 8,286 (0.05%)
 None – 6,269 (0.04%)

1972 Democratic National Convention (Presidential tally):
 George McGovern – 1,729 (57.37%)
 Henry M. Jackson – 525 (17.42%)
 George Wallace – 382 (12.67%)
 Shirley Chisholm – 152 (5.04%)
 Terry Sanford – 78 (2.59%)
 Hubert Humphrey – 67 (2.22%)
 Wilbur Mills – 34 (1.13%)
 Edmund Muskie – 25 (0.83%)
 Ted Kennedy – 13 (0.43%)
 Wayne L. Hays – 5 (0.17%)
 Eugene McCarthy – 2 (0.07%)
 Ramsey Clark, Walter Mondale – 1 each (0.03%)

1972 Democratic National Convention (Vice Presidential tally):

 Thomas Eagleton – 1,742 (59.07%)
 Frances Farenthold – 405 (13.73%)
 Mike Gravel – 226 (7.66%)
 Endicott Peabody – 108 (3.66%)
 Clay Smothers – 74 (2.51%)
 Birch Bayh – 62 (2.10%)
 Peter W. Rodino – 57 (1.93%)
 Jimmy Carter – 30 (1.02%)
 Shirley Chisholm – 20 (0.68%)
 Moon Landrieu – 19 (0.64%)
 Edward T. Breathitt – 18 (0.61%)
 Ted Kennedy – 15 (0.51%)
 Fred R. Harris – 14 (0.48%)
 Richard G. Hatcher – 11 (0.37%)
 Harold Hughes – 10 (0.34%)
 Joseph Montoya – 9 (0.31%)
 William L. Guy – 8 (0.27%)
 Adlai Stevenson III – 8 (0.27%)
 Robert Bergland, Hodding Carter, César Chávez, Wilbur Mills – 5 each (0.17%)
 Wendell Anderson, Stanley Arnold, Ron Dellums, John J. Houlihan, Roberto A. Mondragon – 4 each (0.14%)
 Reubin O'Donovan Askew, Herman Badillo, Eugene McCarthy, Claiborne Pell, Terry Sanford – 3 each (0.10%)
 Ramsey Clark, Richard J. Daley, John DeCarlo, Ernest Gruening, Roger Mudd, Edmund Muskie, Claude Pepper, Abraham A. Ribicoff, Hoyt Patrick Taylor, Jr., Leonard F. Woodcock, Bruno Agnoli – 2 each (0.07%)
 Ernest Albright, William A. Barrett, Daniel Berrigan, Philip Berrigan, Julian Bond, Skipper Bowles, Archibald Burton, Phillip Burton, William Chappell, Lawton Chiles, Frank Church, Robert Drinan, Nick Galifianakis, John Z. Goodrich, Michael Griffin, Martha Griffiths, Charles Hamilton, Patricia Harris, Jim Hunt, Daniel Inouye, Henry M. Jackson, Robery Kariss, Allard K. Lowenstein, Mao Zedong, Eleanor McGovern, Martha Beall Mitchell, Ralph Nader, George Norcross III, Jerry Rubin, Fred Seaman, Joe Smith, Benjamin Spock, Patrick Tavolacci, George Wallace – 1 each (0.03%)

1976 Democratic presidential primaries:
 Jimmy Carter – 6,235,609 (39.27%)
 Jerry Brown – 2,449,374 (15.43%)
 George Wallace – 1,955,388 (12.31%)
 Mo Udall – 1,611,754 (10.15%)
 Henry M. Jackson – 1,134,375 (7.14%)
 Frank Church – 830,818 (5.23%)
 Robert Byrd – 340,309 (2.14%)
 Sargent Shriver – 304,399 (1.92%)
 Unpledged – 283,437 (1.79%)
 Ellen McCormack – 238,027 (1.50%)
 Fred R. Harris – 234,568 (1.48%)
 Milton Shapp – 88,254 (0.56%)
 Birch Bayh – 86,438 (0.54%)
 Hubert Humphrey – 61,992 (0.39%)
 Ted Kennedy – 19,805 (0.13%)
 Lloyd Bentsen – 4,046 (0.03%)
 Terry Sanford – 404 (0.00%)

1976 Democratic National Convention (Presidential tally):
 Jimmy Carter – 2,239 (74.48%)
 Mo Udall – 330 (10.98%)
 Jerry Brown – 301 (10.01%)
 George Wallace – 57 (1.90%)
 Ellen McCormack – 22 (0.73%)
 Frank Church – 19 (0.63%)
 Hubert Humphrey – 10 (0.33%)
 Henry M. Jackson – 10 (0.33%)
 Fred R. Harris – 9 (0.30%)
 Milton Shapp, Robert Byrd – 2 each (0.07%)
 Hugh Carey, Cesar Chavez, Leon Jaworski, Barbara Jordan, Ted Kennedy, George McGovern, Edmund Muskie, Jennings Randolph, Fred Stover – 1 each (0.03%)

1980 Democratic presidential primaries:
 Jimmy Carter (inc.) – 10,043,016 (51.13%)
 Ted Kennedy – 7,381,693 (37.58%)
 Unpledged – 1,288,423 (6.56%)
 Jerry Brown – 575,296 (2.93%)
 Lyndon LaRouche – 177,784 (0.91%)
 Cliff Finch – 48,032 (0.25%)

1980 Democratic National Convention (Presidential tally):
 Jimmy Carter (inc.) – 2,123 (64.04%)
 Ted Kennedy – 1,151 (34.72%)
 William Proxmire – 10 (0.30%)
 Koryne Kaneski Horbal, Scott M. Matheson Sr. – 5 each (0.15%)
 Ron Dellums – 3 (0.09%)
 Robert Byrd, John Culver, Kent Hance, Jennings Randolph, Warren Spannaus, Alice Tripp – 2 each (0.06%)
 Jerry Brown, Dale Bumpers, Hugh L. Carey, Walter Mondale, Edmund Muskie, Thomas J. Steed – 1 each (0.03%)

See also
 Electoral history of John F. Kennedy

References

Kennedy, Ted
Ted Kennedy